Diana Salazar Méndez (born 5 June 1981, Ibarra, Ecuador) is an Ecuadorian jurist and lawyer, and the current Attorney-General of Ecuador.

Early life and education 
Salazar spent her childhood in her native Ibarra, moving to Quito at age 16 with family. She was raised solely by her mother Olivia Méndez, an educational psychologist, along with three siblings.

She is of Afro-Ecuadorian descent. Salazar has a degree in Political and Social Sciences from the Central University of Ecuador. She also has a master's degree in Procedural Law with a Criminal mention, from the Indoamérica Technological University.

Career 
In 2001, at the age of 20, she began working in the Pichincha Prosecutor's Office as an assistant prosecutor, while still studying at the Central University Law School. In 2006 she was promoted as a secretary in the office, and in 2011 she became a prosecutor for the south of the capital.

As prosecutor, Salazar investigated the 2015 FIFA corruption case, in which the ex-president of the Ecuadorian Football Federation Luis Chiriboga was arrested. She later chaired the Financial and Economic Analysis Unit, and directed investigations into corruption, such as then Vice President Jorge Glas's involvement in the Odebrecht scandal.

Diana Salazar was appointed unanimously as the Attorney General of Ecuador by the Council for Citizen Participation and Social Control (Consejo de Participación Ciudadana y Control Social, CPCCS) on 1 April 2019.

References 

Living people
1981 births
Women government ministers of Ecuador
Ecuadorian women lawyers
Ecuadorian women judges
Central University of Ecuador alumni
University of Castilla–La Mancha alumni
People from Ibarra, Ecuador
21st-century Ecuadorian women politicians
21st-century Ecuadorian politicians